Jermaine is the seventh studio album by Jermaine Jackson, his second album in 1980. Fresh off the success of Let's Get Serious, Motown released this album in Fall 1980. Charting on the R&B albums chart at 17 with two singles ("You Like Me Don't You" and "Little Girl (Don't You Worry)") charting top 20 on the R&B singles chart, respectively. Also included is a cover of Tyrone Davis's "Can I Change My Mind".  Also included as a musician on this album is family friend John McClain, who would later become one of the executives of the estate of Jermaine's brother, Michael Jackson.

Track listing
Side A
"The Pieces Fit" (Jermaine Jackson, Paul Jackson, Jr., Angelo Bond) 5:22
"You Like Me Don't You" (Jermaine Jackson) 5:00
"Little Girl Don't You Worry" (Jermaine Jackson, Paul Jackson, Jr.) 4:48
"All Because of You" (Jermaine Jackson, Angelo Bond) 4:43
"You've Changed (Interlude)" (Jermaine Jackson) 1:52

Side B
"First You Laugh, Then You Cry" (Jermaine Jackson, Chris Clark) 4:52
"I Miss You So" (Jimmie Henderson, Bertha Scott, Sid Robin) 2:46
"Can I Change My Mind" (Barry Despenza, Carl Wolfolk) 3:30
"Beautiful Morning" (Jermaine Jackson, Hazel G. Jackson, Eddie Fluellen) 5:14

Personnel
Jermaine Jackson - vocals, bass, piano, Fender Rhodes, percussion, guitars, synthesizers
Herbie Hancock, David Benoit, Clarence McDonald, Eddie Fluellen, Michael Lang, Reginald Burke - keyboards
Paul Jackson, Jr., Charles Fearing - guitars
David Williams, Nathan East - bass
John McClain - sitar
Gregory Williams - flugelhorn
Ollie E. Brown - drums
Stevie Wonder - harmonica on "You Like Me Don't You" and "I Miss You So" (uncredited)
 Technical
Johnny Lee - art direction
Ginny Livingston - cover design
Matthew Rolston - photography

Charts

Singles

References

External links
 Jermaine Jackson-Jermaine at Discogs

1980 albums
Jermaine Jackson albums
Albums produced by Berry Gordy
Motown albums